Mary FitzMaurice, 4th Countess of Orkney (née O'Brien; 4 September 1755 – 30 December 1831) was a Scottish peer, the only surviving child of Murrough O'Brien, 1st Marquess of Thomond and Mary O'Brien, 3rd Countess of Orkney.

She was married to the Hon. Thomas FitzMaurice, younger brother of the 1st Marquess of Lansdowne, on 21 December 1777. Their son, born in 1778, was John FitzMaurice, Viscount Kirkwall (who was the father of the 5th Earl of Orkney, Thomas John Hamilton FitzMaurice). She succeeded her mother on 10 May 1791. Her husband died in 1793 with the Countess retaining possession of Cliveden, the family seat of the Earls of Orkney, now owned by the National Trust.

She died in 1831 in Beaconsfield.

References

FitzMaurice, Mary
FitzMaurice, Mary
FitzMaurice, Mary
Orkney, Mary FitzMaurice, 4th Countess of
Earls of Orkney
Orkney, Mary Fitzmaurice
Mary
18th-century Scottish people
18th-century Scottish women
19th-century Scottish people
19th-century Scottish women